Richard Jobson may refer to:

Richard Jobson (explorer), 17th-century English explorer
Richard Jobson (footballer) (born 1963), English former footballer
Richard Jobson (television presenter) (born 1960), filmmaker, TV presenter, and musician, formerly of Skids